Zhao Chengliang (Chinese: 赵成亮; Pinyin: Zhào Chéngliàng; born 1 June 1984 in Qujing) is a Chinese race walker. Zhao won the 50 km walk event at the 11th Chinese National Games in 2009.

Achievements

References

1984 births
Living people
Chinese male racewalkers
Athletes (track and field) at the 2008 Summer Olympics
Olympic athletes of China
Athletes from Yunnan
People from Qujing